Bimbo is slang referring to an attractive but unintelligent woman.

Bimbo may also refer to:

People
Bimbo, nickname of Franz Binder (1911–1989), Austrian soccer player
Bimbo Ademoye (born 1991), Nigerian actress
Bimbo Danao (1915–1967), Filipino actor
Bimbo Odukoya (1960–2005), Nigerian pastor and televangelist
Bimbo Coles (born 1968), American basketball player
Bimbo Carmona (born 1983), Puerto Rican basketball player
Katalin Bimbó (born 1963), Canadian philosopher

Places
 Bimbo, Central African Republic, capital of Ombella-M'poko prefecture

Business
Grupo Bimbo, a Mexican-based baking conglomerate
Bimbo Bakeries USA, the largest bakery company in the United States
Bimbo, a soft drink sold in Peru, now a subsidiary of Coca-Cola
Management buy-in#Buy-in management buyout (BIMBO), a form of acquisition of a company

Arts and entertainment
Bimbo, play by Keith Waterhouse
Bimbo the Birthday Clown, a cardboard cut-out on The Uncle Bobby Show, a Canadian children's program that ran from 1964 to 1979
Bimbo, a Siamese cat character in books for children by Enid Blyton
Miss Bimbo, a British online fashion game

Animation and comics
Bimbo (Fleischer Studios), a 1930s Fleischer Studios cartoon dog character, boyfriend of Betty Boop
Bimbo (comics), a British children's comic that ran from 1961 until 1972
The Circus of P.T. Bimbo, a 1970s comic strip by Howie Schneider

Music
Bimbo (musical group), an Indonesian religious vocal group
Bimbo Jet, a French Euro disco group, known for their hit "El Bimbo"
Bimbo (Virgin album), 2004
Bimbo (Jim Reeves album), 1957
"Bimbo" (song), a 1954 song by Jim Reeves, covered by Gene Autry
"Bimbo", a 2001 single by Lambretta
"Bimbo", a song by Yello, from the album Solid Pleasure